The Republic of Ireland football league system currently consists of 12 levels. Traditionally association football leagues in the Republic of Ireland have been classified as either senior, intermediate or junior. These leagues are effectively national, provincial and district leagues respectively. The two highest level leagues/divisions, the League of Ireland Premier Division and the League of Ireland First Division are both national leagues. Together they make up the League of Ireland. The third level currently consists of three provincial leagues – the Leinster Senior League Senior Division, the Munster Senior League Senior Premier Division and the Ulster Senior League Senior Division.

History

Senior
The original top-level league for what is now the Republic of Ireland was the Irish Football League. Founded in 1890, this league is now the Northern Ireland Football League. Before the partition of Ireland, three Dublin clubs – Bohemians, Shelbourne and Tritonville – played in the Irish Football League. The League of Ireland was founded in 
1921 and its Premier Division is now the top level division.

Intermediate
The two oldest association football leagues in what is now the Republic of Ireland are the Leinster Senior League and the Munster Senior League. The former was founded in 1896 while the latter first appeared in the early 1900s. The Leinster Senior League's jurisdiction included the Greater Dublin Area, the most populated region in the country, and as a result it was effectively a de facto second-level league between 1896–97 and 1964–65. In 1964 the League of Ireland formed the first formal national second level division, the League of Ireland B Division. In 1985, following a reorganisation, the B Division was replaced as the second-level league by the League of Ireland First Division. As part of this reorganisation, a promotion and relegation system involving the top two national divisions was introduced for the first time.

Junior
From 1964–65 until 2008 the Leinster Senior League and the Munster Senior League formed the third level. They were subsequently joined at this level by the Connacht Senior League in 1981 and the Ulster Senior League in 1986. Between 2008 and 2011, the provincial leagues were briefly replaced as the third level by a short lived national third level league known as the A Championship. Following the demise of the A Championship, the provincial leagues regained their third level status.

Cup eligibility 
Being members of a league at a particular level also affects eligibility for Cup, or single-elimination, competitions.

 FAI Cup: Levels 1 to 3
 League of Ireland Cup: Levels 1 to 2
 FAI Intermediate Cup: Levels 3 to 7
 FAI Junior Cup: Levels 7 to 12

Below level 6 the pyramid becomes regional and the cups become accordingly regional. Further down the pyramid is split on a county basis, counties having their own cups accordingly. This excludes some tournaments marked "Senior Cups", which often are competitions between teams representing top professional clubs in a given district.

Promotion and relegation
A promotion and relegation system has existed between the League of Ireland Premier Division and the League of Ireland First Division since 1985–86. Between 2008 and 2011, A Championship teams were also eligible for promotion to the First Division. Promotion and relegation systems also operate within the separate provincial league systems. There is no formal promotion and relegation relationship between the provincial leagues and the League of Ireland. Teams have been invited to join the League of Ireland however. In 2015, Cabinteely of the Leinster Senior League became the most recent team to accept an invite. In 2022, it was revealed that a third tier in the League of Ireland would be launched in 2023, but although not formally announced by the FAI, the third tier got postponed until 2024, due to lack of interest from clubs in the country.

The system 
Level one in the pyramid, the top division of Irish football, is run by the League of Ireland Premier Division (which gives its name to the competition in that division), the winners of which are regarded as the champions of the Republic of Ireland. Level two is run by the League of Ireland. Together, these two divisions make up what is known as "league football".

The leagues below level two are classed as "non-League football", meaning they are outside the League of Ireland. The leagues at levels three to six comprise the Provincial League System, and are run by the Provinces. The top level (level 3) of the Provincial leagues is known as the Senior Leagues and the winners of which are regarded as the champions of their respective Province. Levels seven to twelve are designed as "Regional Feeder Leagues" or District Leagues.

There is currently no promotion or relegation system between the League of Ireland First Division (Level 2) and the provincial leagues (Level 3) in place. Therefore, there is no movement between the football league and non-league football and the only way non-league club can enter the football league is if they are elected.

See also 
Northern Irish football league system

Notes

References 

Ireland